Le Châtelet is a commune in the Cher department in the Centre-Val de Loire region of France.

Geography 

Population

Sights
 The abbey church of Notre-Dame, dating from the twelfth century.
 The seventeenth century manorhouse de La Charnaye.
 Trace remains of a 12th-century castle.
 A pottery museum at the hamlet of Archers.

See also
Communes of the Cher department

References

External links

Le Châtelet - Website of the village 

Communes of Cher (department)